Bennett Sims is an American fiction writer with two book publications, the novel A Questionable Shape and the short story collection White Dialogues. He is an assistant professor at the University of Iowa.

Early life and education 
Sims was born and raised in Baton Rouge, Louisiana. During high school, he spent three summers in the New Orleans Center for Creative Arts' boarding program, where he wrote fiction. He graduated from Pomona College in 2008, where he was mentored by David Foster Wallace. He later graduated from the Iowa Writers' Workshop, where he was a Truman Capote Fellow, and he served as a Provost's Postgraduate Visiting Writer at the University of Iowa from 2012-2013.

Career 
Sims's debut novel, A Questionable Shape, was published by Two Dollar Radio on May 1, 2013. It was named one of the best books of 2013 by Complex Book Riot, and L Magazine. It was shortlisted for the 2013 Believer Book Award and won the 2014 Bard Fiction Prize, which included a $30,000 cash prize and a semester-long writer-in-residence appointment at Bard College.

Reviews often referred to the book as a novel with zombies that is not a zombie novel, set in Louisiana and referring opaquely to the aftermath of Hurricane Katrina. It received generally positive reviews from media outlets including The Guardian, Electric Literature, Los Angeles Review of Books, Publishers Weekly, and The Millions.

In 2017, Sims published his second book, a short story collection called White Dialogues, with Two Dollar Radio on September 12, 2017. Carmen Maria Machado called the collection "[o]ne of the most genuinely terrifying, brilliant short story collections of the past decade" in Literary Hub and Hannah Pittard wrote that it "moves readers from one beleaguered mind to another by way of nearly hysterical examination" in The New York Times Book Review. It also received positive reviews from Publishers Weekly, Kirkus Reviews, and Bookforum, in which Tony Tulathimutte called Sims "possibly the smartest and most inventive writer of his (my) generation." After the publication of the book, Sims was a Rome Prize Fellow at the American Academy in Rome in 2018-2019, where he worked on his third book, a novel.

His stories have been published in The Iowa Review, Story, Conjunctions, Ploughshares, and the Pushcart Prize Anthology.

He currently teaches undergraduate fiction courses at the University of Iowa.

References 

Year of birth missing (living people)
Living people
Iowa Writers' Workshop alumni
Pomona College alumni
American male short story writers
21st-century American novelists
University of Iowa faculty
21st-century American male writers
American horror writers
Novelists from Louisiana
Writers from Iowa City, Iowa
Writers from Baton Rouge, Louisiana
Novelists from Iowa